Andrew D. Huxley (born 1966) is a chair of the physics department of the University of Edinburgh.

Biography
Of no relation to Sir Andrew F. Huxley (the English physiologist and biophysicist), Huxley is known in the field of condensed matter physics. While at the CEA laboratory in Grenoble, Huxley was involved in the revolutionary discovery of superconductivity in the ferromagnet UGe2 under applied pressure, in collaboration with a team at the University of Cambridge. This was followed up by a series of breakthroughs in another ferromagnetic material, URhGe [3-5], which was found to turn superconducting under the application of an external magnetic field. This emergence of an unconventional superconducting state by the application of an external tuning parameter such as magnetic field or pressure is hypothesised to be closely related to a 'Quantum critical point' (QCP) - a special phase transition that occurs at temperatures approaching zero kelvins. Quantum fluctuations are enhanced at the QCP, destabilising the conventional phase that dominates under ambient conditions, making conditions propitious for the emergence of a novel unconventional phase such as superconductivity, or possibly even more exotic states.

Huxley graduated with a BA from Churchill College, Cambridge, an MS from the University of Pennsylvania, and a PhD from the University of Cambridge. He was subsequently a postdoctoral fellow and then a scientist at CEA, Grenoble before joining the University of Edinburgh as a Professor of Physics in 2006. Huxley is an alumna of the Quantum Matter Group (formerly the Low Temperature Physics) of the Cavendish Laboratory, University of Cambridge that have gone on to become leading physicists.

Selected publications

See also

 University of Edinburgh School of Physics and Astronomy

Academics of the University of Edinburgh
Living people
1966 births
Alumni of Churchill College, Cambridge
University of Pennsylvania alumni